Abraham (8th century) was ruler of the Nubian kingdom of Makuria.

According to Severus of El Ashmunein, upon the death of king Simon, Zacharias the son of king Merkurios then appointed Abraham, "a valiant youth attached to the palace" to succeed Simon.1 However, Abraham proved to be an unsatisfactory ruler, and refused the advice of his mentor, bishop Kyriakos, and in the end sent him with letters "full of false testimonies" to Patriarch Michael I. Patriarch Michael invoked a synod where king Abraham's accusations were read, and Abraham's plea to replace bishop Kyriakos with his own nominee, a man named John.

Despite the outrageousness of king Abraham's claims the synod acquiesced to his demands, but in response to a miraculous event Kyriakos was permitted to return to Makuria, where he settled in a monastery. Severus claims that for the remaining 24 years of the former bishop's life, no rain fell in Makuria, "every year the people were visited by a pestilence, and that those who bore false witness against him were suddenly struck blind". When he learned what had happened, the former king Zacharias deposed Abraham and exiled him to an island in the middle of the Nile, replacing him with Markos.

Notes 
 B. Evetts, History of the Patriarchs of the Coptic Church of Alexandria, Part 3 (1910)

Nubian people
Kingdom of Makuria
8th-century monarchs in Africa